The Greatest Hits Collection is the first compilation album by American country music duo Brooks & Dunn. It was released in 1997 (see 1997 in country music) on Arista Nashville, and it chronicles the greatest hits from their first four studio albums: 1991's Brand New Man, 1993's Hard Workin' Man, 1994's Waitin' on Sundown, and 1996's Borderline. The album also includes three new tracks, two of which were released as singles: "Honky Tonk Truth" and "He's Got You", which respectively reached #3 and #2 on the Billboard Hot Country Singles & Tracks (now Hot Country Songs) charts.  While the CD version is currently out of print, digital and streaming services carry it in their library. In 2004, a sequel, The Greatest Hits Collection II, was released.

The album was certified 4× Platinum by the RIAA on July 21, 2005.  It has sold 4,608,400 copies in the United States as of April 2017.

Track listing

ANewly recorded tracks.
BPreviously Unreleased

Personnel on new tracks
Compiled from the liner notes.

Brooks & Dunn
Kix Brooks – lead vocals on "Days of Thunder", background vocals on "Honky Tonk Truth" and "He's Got You"
Ronnie Dunn – lead vocals on "Honky Tonk Truth" and "He's Got You", background vocals on "Days of Thunder"

Additional musicians
Bruce Bouton – steel guitar 
Dennis Burnside – Hammond organ 
Steve Gibson – acoustic guitar 
Rob Hajacos – fiddle 
Wes Hightower – background vocals 
David Hungate – bass guitar 
John Barlow Jarvis – piano 
Liana Manis – background vocals 
Brent Mason – electric guitar 
Terry McBride – background vocals 
John Wesley Ryles – background vocals 
Lonnie Wilson – drums, percussion

Chart performance

Weekly charts

Year-end charts

Certifications

References

1997 greatest hits albums
Brooks & Dunn albums
Arista Records compilation albums